Events in the year 1925 in Spain.

Incumbents
Monarch: Alfonso XIII
President of the Council of Ministers: Miguel Primo de Rivera

Events
8 May - The final attack in the Rif War is launched by France and Spain, who between them field 123,000 men, supported by 150 aircraft, against 12,000 Rifians.

Births
8 January -  Bernardo Ruiz, road bicycle racer
11 February - Amparo Rivelles, actress (died 2013)
4 June - Antonio Puchades, footballer (died 2014)
16 September - Odón Betanzos Palacios, poet, novelist and literary critic (died 2007)
26 September - Manuel Izquierdo, sculptor and woodcut artist (died 2009) 
5 October -  Emiliano Aguirre, palaeontologist (died 2021)
20 December - Oriol Bohigas, architect and urban planner (died 2021)

Date unknown
Serafín Rojo, Spanish cartoon humorist and painter (died 2003)
Ignacio Sanuy, musicologist, journalist, lawyer, music critic and historian (died 1995)

Deaths
23 September - Miguel Zabalza, Olympic fencer (born 1896).

References

 
Years of the 20th century in Spain
1920s in Spain
Spain
Spain